Beatrice Lascaris di Tenda or Beatrice de Tende or Beatrix (c. 1372 – 1418), was an Italian noblewoman who was the wife of Facino Cane, Count of Biandrate and a  condottiero, and then wife to Filippo Maria Visconti, Duke of Milan, who had her killed.

Family
Beatrice was born in 1370 or 1372 or 1376. She was the daughter of Pietro Balbo II and the sister of Giovanni Antonio I Lascaris Count of Tende and grew in an ancestral castle erected in a valley that opens to the north of the Col di Tenda. She was part of the Lascaris di Ventimiglia Conti di Tenda, a branch of the House of Ventimiglia, who were sovereigns of a large province in Maritime Alps area.

First marriage

On September 2, 1403, she married Facino Cane of Montferrat, a military commander and condottiero, who usually was in the service of the Visconti dukes.  He reputedly treated her with great consideration and respect and divided his honors and treasures with her. She is said to have accompanied him in battle.

Facino Cane died May 19, 1412 at Pavia, the very day of the assassination of Giovanni Maria Visconti, the second duke of Milan. Cane's death left Beatrice a very rich widow. She had four hundred thousand ducats, the domain of those towns and lands that were in her dead husband's control, and many men-at-arms.

Second marriage

Filippo Maria Visconti succeeded his murdered brother in the Duchy of Milan. Some of his council advised him to marry Beatrice, whose worth exceeded his own personal fortune and territorial control, despite that she was twenty years his elder. Once he obtained his new wife's resources, he easily conquered the various rulers of the smaller neighboring domains. Building on the Facino's foundation, he reconstructed a state that began to compare of that of his father, Gian Galeazzo Visconti, before it fell apart under his brother Giovanni's rule.

However, despite the wealth, territory, and military strength that she had brought to him, Filippo grew averse to Beatrice, perhaps because of jealousy of her late husband's reputation, or her own political power, or her greater age, or that she bore no children, or his favoring of his mistress, the much younger Agnese del Maino.

Torture and execution

Unable to denounce his wife publicly, he effected a scheme common among the nobility of the time, that of adultery. Among those of the Duchess Beatrice's household was a young troubadour and friend, Michele Orombelli, who often entertained the lady with lute and song.  To avoid any possibility of an uprising that might try to free the popular Duchess, on August 23, 1418, he had the doors of Milan closed until lunchtime, and had the troubadour, the Duchess, and two of her handmaidens spirited away to the castle of Binasco. In its confines, the captors tortured the prisoners. The handmaidens confessed to having seen the duchess with Orombelli sitting on the bed playing the lute. The torturers forced Orombelli into confession of adultery. Although Beatrice herself received twenty-four lashes, she denied any guilt to her confessor.

A jurist, Gasparino de' Grassi Castiglione, proclaimed Beatrice, the troubadour, and the handmaidens all guilty of adultery or its complicity, and sentenced them to death. Her captors beheaded Beatrice in the courtyard on September 13, 1418, accompanied in death by her two maids and the young troubadour.

Literary and historical accounts

According to many accounts, Beatrice appears as an intelligent woman who concerned herself in the current affairs of state. Her reputation for honesty and modesty made her a martyr in the eyes of many. Her story inspired many writers. A book written by 	Carlo Tedaldi-Fores inspired Vincenzo Bellini to write a two-act opera, Beatrice di Tenda, first performed on March 16, 1833 at the La Fenice in Venice. Sarah Josepha Hale included a laudatory article about her in her encyclopedic Woman's record; or, Sketches of all distinguished women from the creation to A.D. 1854.  She also appears as a minor character in Bellarion by Raphael Sabatini.

In their revision of Bernardino Corio's history of Milan, Angelo Butti and Luigi Ferrario noted that contemporaries had differing opinions of Beatrice Lascaris di Tenda. They wrote that Rainaldi and Fleury claimed that Beatrice plotted against her Visconti husband in conducting secret correspondence with the Bishop of Passau and the Earl of Oettingen, and that they sent ambassadors to the Emperor Sigismund. They noted that Pietro Candido Decembrio, secretary to Filippo Maria Visconti, openly condemned her petulant and greedy nature. Butti and Ferrario also wrote that Andrea Biglia, an Augustinian friar and Italian humanist, chronicled that Beatrice was already advanced in years, and could no longer attract her husband, nor offer the hope of children.

References

1370 births
1418 deaths
15th-century executions
15th-century Italian nobility
15th-century Italian women
Duchesses of Milan
Executed Italian women
People executed by the Duchy of Milan
People executed for adultery
House of Ventimiglia
People executed in the Holy Roman Empire by decapitation